Chappe may refer to:

 Claude Chappe (1763 – 1805), French inventor 
 David Chappe (1947 - 2002), American screenwriter
 Georges Chappe (b. 1944), French cyclist
 Jean-Baptiste Chappe d'Auteroche (1722-1769), French astronomer
 Chappe (crater), lunar crater
 16238 Chappe, main belt asteroid
 a flap of leather attached to a sword's crossguard, also known as a rain-guard

See also

 Chap (disambiguation)
 Chappes (disambiguation)